The Canton of Vihiers is a former French canton located in the Maine-et-Loire département of France, in the arrondissement of Saumur. It had 15,365 inhabitants (2012). It was disbanded following the French canton reorganisation which came into effect in March 2015.

The canton comprised the following communes:

Aubigné-sur-Layon
Cernusson
Les Cerqueux-sous-Passavant
Cléré-sur-Layon
Coron
La Fosse-de-Tigné
Montilliers
Nueil-sur-Layon
Passavant-sur-Layon
La Plaine
Saint-Paul-du-Bois
La Salle-de-Vihiers
Somloire
Tigné
Trémont
Tancoigné
Vihiers

See also 
 Cantons of the Maine-et-Loire department
 Communes of the Maine-et-Loire department

References

External links
 canton of Vihiers on the web of the General Council of Maine-et-Loire

Vihiers
2015 disestablishments in France
States and territories disestablished in 2015